Robert William Dobson (born 1942), is a male former athlete who competed for England.

Athletics career
He represented England in the 20 miles walk, at the 1970 British Commonwealth Games in Edinburgh, Scotland.

The following year he competed in the 1971 European Athletics Championships in Helsinki where he competed in the 50 kilometres walk. He also represented Great Britain at the 1976 World Championships in Athletics in Malmö.

He was a six times winner of the British Race Walking Association Championships, three at 35 Km and three at 50 Km.

References

1942 births
English male racewalkers
Athletes (track and field) at the 1970 British Commonwealth Games
Living people
Commonwealth Games competitors for England